Catherine Fox is an American former Olympic swimmer

Catherine Fox may also refer to:
 
 Catherine Fox (nurse)  (1877–1915), New Zealand nurse
 Catherine Fox (journalist), Australian journalist, author, feminist and public speaker
 Catherine Fox (1837–1892), spiritualist, one of the Fox sisters

See also
Kate Fox (disambiguation)